Herminamezei Atlétikai Club was a Hungarian football club from the town of Zugló, Budapest, Hungary.

History
Herminamezei Atlétikai Club debuted in the 1945–46 season of the Hungarian League and finished eleventh.

Name Changes 
1920–1929: Világosság Sport Club
1929–1946: Herminamezei AC
1946–1948: Zugló Herminamezei AC
1948: merger with Budapesti Meteor SzTK

References

External links
 Profile

Football clubs in Hungary
Defunct football clubs in Hungary
1920 establishments in Hungary